The  is a Shinto shrine located in Shinjuku, Tokyo, Japan. This shrine was founded in the mid-17th century. Hanazono Jinja nestled in the heart of Tokyo's Shinjuku ward, Hanazono Jinja is a small and unobtrusive structure that, according to Fodor's, just happens to be one of the most historical shrines in Japan. Constructed in the Edo period by the Hanazono family, this Inari shrine—a shrine dedicated to Inari, the androgynous god of fertility and worldly success—is a favorite place for businessmen to pray for successful ventures.

History

Hanazono Shrine was originally founded before the start of the Edo period, about 250 meters south of its present-day location. In the Kan'ei era, the shrine was relocated to the gardens of the Owari-Tokugawa family, in an area that had until then been a prolific flower garden, to make space for the villa of a shogun’s vassal. Before the Meiji period, a branch temple of a Shingon Buddhism sect was enshrined with Hanazono’s Shinto shrine, and the Buddhist chief priest served as the manager of both. During the Meiji Restoration that began in March of 1868, the Buddhist object of worship was abolished from Hanazono, and the religious space returned to only a Shinto shrine. At the time, it was named simply “town Inari shrine” because of a mistake in the submission to the official list of names. It was officially named "Hanazono Shrine" in 1965.

Annual events
 January 1 - Gantan, The Japanese New Year
 January  - Yunohana-Matsuri, New Year's bonfires 
 February  - Setsubun Festival
 February - Hatsu'uma-Matsuri, Festival on The First Horse's Day
 May - Shinkō-sai, annual festival
 June 30 - Nagoshi-no-harae, purification ceremony in the middle of the year
 August - Obon
 November - Tori-no-Ichi, open-air market held at Rooster's day
 December 31 - Toshikoshi-no-ōharae, purification ceremony in Ōmisoka, the last day of the year

Images

See also 
List of Tōshō-gū

References

Inari shrines
Shinjuku
Shinto shrines in Tokyo